Brendan Brisson (born October 22, 2001) is an American ice hockey center for the Henderson Silver Knights of the American Hockey League (AHL) as a prospect for the Vegas Golden Knights of the National Hockey League (NHL). He was drafted 29th overall by the Golden Knights in the 2020 NHL Entry Draft. Brendan is the son of NHL agent Pat Brisson.

Early life
Brisson played youth hockey for the Los Angeles Jr. Kings and then played Prep hockey for Shattuck-Saint Mary's in Faribault, Minnesota. During the 2018–19 season in his senior year, he recorded 101 points in 55 games leading the team in points and goals scored.

Playing career

Junior
During the 2018–19 season, he played six games for the Green Bay Gamblers of the United States Hockey League (USHL). During the 2019–20 USHL season, Brisson recorded 24 goals and 35 assists in 45 games for the Chicago Steel, ranking second in the league in scoring with 59 points. Following an outstanding season, he was named to the first team All-USHL and USHL All-Rookie Team and named USHL Rookie of the Year.

College
Brisson began his collegiate career for the University of Michigan during the 2020–21 NCAA Division I season. He recorded ten goals and 11 assists in 24 games for the Wolverines. During the 2021–22 season in his sophomore season, he ranked third on the team in scoring with 35 points on 18 goals and 17 assists, averaging 1.03 points per game. He ranked second in the nation in game-winning goals with six and scored the first goal in a game seven times during the season. Following an outstanding season, he was named to the All-Big Ten Second Team.

Professional
On April 12, 2022, Brisson signed an amateur tryout contract with the Golden Knights AHL affiliate, the Henderson Silver Knights, for the remainder of the 2021–22 season. He recorded three goals and five assists in six AHL games for the Silver Knights. On April 30, Brisson signed a three-year, entry-level contract with the Vegas Golden Knights.

International play

Brisson represented the United States at the 2021 World Junior Ice Hockey Championships, where he recorded two goals in seven games and won a gold medal. On January 13, 2022, Brisson was named to Team USA's roster to represent the United States at the 2022 Winter Olympics.

Career statistics

Regular season and playoffs

International

Awards and honours

References

External links
 

2001 births
Living people
American men's ice hockey centers
Chicago Steel players
Green Bay Gamblers players
Henderson Silver Knights players
Michigan Wolverines men's ice hockey players
National Hockey League first-round draft picks
Sportspeople from Manhattan Beach, California
Vegas Golden Knights draft picks
Ice hockey players at the 2022 Winter Olympics
Olympic ice hockey players of the United States